Season one of Odin v odin! premiered on March 3, 2013.

Celebrities

Imitations chart

  Highest scoring performance
  Lowest scoring performance
  Qualified for the final
  Didn't qualify for the final

The following chart contains the names of the iconic singers that the celebrities imitated every week.

Episodes

Week 1 (March 3)

Week 2 (March 10)

Also in the beginning performed hors concours Aleksand Oleshko and Nonna Grishayeva as Leonid Utyosov and Lyubov Orlova (potpourri of song from Jolly Fellows movie)

Week 3 (March 17)

Week 4 (March 24)
Guest: Sergey Zhukov (Ruki Vverh!)

Week 5 (March 31)

Week 6 (April 7)
Guests: Diana Arbenina (Nochniye Snaiperi), Dima Bilan

Also in the beginning performed hors concours Larisa Dolina as Cher with Strong Enough.

Week 7 (April 14)
Guests: Sergey Mazayev (Moralny codex), Bogdan Titomir

Week 8 (April 21)
Guests: Yuri Antonov, Nyusha

Week 9 (April 28)
Guest: Ani Lorak (performed hous concours as Adele with Rolling in the Deep).

Week 10 (May 12)

Week 11 (May 19)—Semi-Final

Total score after the eleventh week
 Alexey Chumakov — 500 points
 Timur Rodriguez — 454 points
 Yulia Savicheva — 414 points
 Anita Tsoy — 393 points
 Anastasia Stotskaya — 347 points
  Eva Polna — 298 points
  Sergey Penkin — 292 points
  Sati Kazanova — 273 points
  Alexey Kortnev — 257 points
  Eugeny Kungurov — 226 points

Week 12 (May 26)—Final
Guest — Victor Drobysh.

The winner between five best contestants (Chumakov, Rodriguez, Savicheva, Tsoy, Stotskaya) was defined by SMS-voting during the life-airing.

After the finalists' appearances were displayed hours concours performances

Top 3 Best results

 Highest scoring performance

References

One to One!
2013 Russian television seasons